Poor Boy is a 2016 American Western film directed by Robert Scott Wildes and written by Logan Antill. The film stars Lou Taylor Pucci and Dov Tiefenbach.

Plot summary 
Romeo and Samson Griggs are two brothers who live in the desert. Left at birth in the will of fate, and growing up without any purpose in life, these brainless young men, survive by gambling and hustling. When a mysterious woman threatens to repo their much beloved houseboat, Prickface and Poor Boy, as they are nicknamed by the locals, cook up the biggest theft yet. With the goal of making enough money for moving to California, the brothers are planning to leave behind their miserable lives once for all.

Cast 
 Lou Taylor Pucci as Romeo Griggs
 Dov Tiefenbach as Samson Griggs
 Pat Healy as Vern Rickey
 Justin Chatwin as Jackie Clean
 Andy Bean as Drime
 Amanda Crew as Charlene Rox
 Jon Foster as Roscoe Joe
 Michael Shannon as Blayde Griggs
 Amy Ferguson as Cynthia Ravenblanket
 Dale Dickey as Deb Chilson
 Eszter Balint as Missus Waxman

Production 
In March 2015, Lou Taylor Pucci announced that he will star in the film, with Robert Scott Wildes directing from a screenplay he wrote with Logan Antill, Kristin Mann serving as producer.

Principal photography began on May 6, 2015 in Las Vegas, and concluded on June 1, 2015, with a total of 20 days of shooting.

Release
Poor Boy had its world premiere at the Tribeca Film Festival on April 17, 2016. Indican Pictures acquired the domestic distribution rights and released the film on July 13, 2018, in select theaters and through video on demand.

References

External links

2016 films
2016 Western (genre) films
American Western (genre) films
Neo-Western films
2010s English-language films
2010s American films